Elena Agafonnikova (born March 14, 1965) is a former Soviet and Russian female professional basketball player.

External links
Profile at fibaeurope.com

1965 births
Living people
Sportspeople from Volgograd
Russian women's basketball players
Soviet women's basketball players